The Mehe is a river in Lower Saxony, Germany. It flows into the Oste near Kranenburg.

See also
List of rivers of Lower Saxony

References

Cuxhaven (district)
Rivers of Lower Saxony
Rotenburg (district)
Rivers of Germany